Franz Nietlispach (born 2 April 1958) is a Swiss wheelchair athlete, handcyclist, and a politician.

He has competed in every Summer Paralympic Games from 1976 to 2008, winning an incredible total of fourteen gold, six silver, and two bronze medals. All of these medals were for athletics, except for one bronze earned in hand-cycling at the 2004 Games. At the 2008 Beijing Games, Nietlispach competed only in cycling; this was the first time he appeared at the Paralympics without participating in an athletics event. He also competed in table tennis early in his career, taking part in that sport at the 1976 and 1980 Paralympics.

He has, impressively, won the men's wheelchair division of the Boston Marathon five times. He has also held political office in Aargau.

In 2006, Franz Nietlispach began a project in which he got together with Jaroslaw Baranowsky from Poland, to create a lighter, more aero-dynamic hand-cycle. He tested prototypes at races, and experimented with using carbon. They ended up selling around 60-80 carbon hand-cycles per year - however, he does not do that anymore, focussing on his racing and the Paralympics.

See also 
 Athletes with most gold medals in one sport at the Paralympic Games

References

External links 
 

1958 births
Living people
People from Muri District
Swiss male wheelchair racers
Swiss male table tennis players
Paralympic athletes of Switzerland
Free Democratic Party of Switzerland politicians
Athletes (track and field) at the 1976 Summer Paralympics
Athletes (track and field) at the 1980 Summer Paralympics
Athletes (track and field) at the 1984 Summer Paralympics
Athletes (track and field) at the 1988 Summer Paralympics
Athletes (track and field) at the 1992 Summer Paralympics
Athletes (track and field) at the 1996 Summer Paralympics
Athletes (track and field) at the 2000 Summer Paralympics
Athletes (track and field) at the 2004 Summer Paralympics
Paralympic table tennis players of Switzerland
Table tennis players at the 1976 Summer Paralympics
Table tennis players at the 1980 Summer Paralympics
Paralympic cyclists of Switzerland
Cyclists at the 2004 Summer Paralympics
Cyclists at the 2008 Summer Paralympics
Paralympic gold medalists for Switzerland
Paralympic silver medalists for Switzerland
Paralympic bronze medalists for Switzerland
Wheelchair racers at the 1992 Summer Olympics
Wheelchair racers at the 1996 Summer Olympics
Paralympic wheelchair racers
Medalists at the 1984 Summer Paralympics
Medalists at the 1988 Summer Paralympics
Medalists at the 1996 Summer Paralympics
Medalists at the 2000 Summer Paralympics
Medalists at the 2004 Summer Paralympics
Paralympic medalists in athletics (track and field)
Paralympic medalists in cycling